Alstad is a village in Sweden.

Alstad may also refer to:

People
Ida Alstad (born 1985), Norwegian handball player
Jon Olav Alstad (born 1968), Norwegian politician

See also 
Ålstad